Rastetter is a surname. Notable people with the surname include:
Bruce Rastetter, American agribusiness executive
Tanja Rastetter (born 1971), German footballer
William Rastetter (born 1948), American biopharmaceutical business executive